Circus People (German: Die vom Zirkus) is a 1922 German silent drama film directed by William Kahn and starring Anita Berber, Charles Willy Kayser and Eduard von Winterstein.

The film's sets were designed by the art director August Rinaldi.

Cast
 Anita Berber as Die Zirkusdiva 
 Charles Willy Kayser
 Eduard von Winterstein
 Eugen Burg
 Rudolf Del Zopp
 Toni Ebärg
 Karl Harbacher
 Ernst Hofmann
 Helena Makowska
 Julius Markow
 Heinrich Peer
 Ernst Pittschau
 Heddy Sven

References

Bibliography
 Grange, William. Cultural Chronicle of the Weimar Republic. Scarecrow Press, 2008.
 Töteberg, Michael . Das Ufa-Buch. Zweitausendeins, 1992.

External links

1922 films
Films of the Weimar Republic
Films directed by William Kahn
German silent feature films
German black-and-white films
1922 drama films
German drama films
UFA GmbH films
Silent drama films
1920s German films